The present 14th Dalai Lama has suggested different possibilities to identify the next (15th) Dalai Lama, but has not publicly specified the ritual qualifications and alleged mystical signs upon the method of rebirth would occur. On 5 February  1940, request to exempt Lhamo Thondup from lot-drawing Golden Urn process to become the 14th Dalai Lama was approved by the Central Government.

The selection process remains controversial, as the atheist Chinese government has declared ownership on the selection process using the Golden Urn for the next Dalai Lama.

After the Method of Reincarnation of Lamas (Chinese: 喇嘛轉世辦法) was abolished in 2004, the Religious Affairs Regulations  was published by the Central Government of China. Article 36 states that the process of reincarnation system must follow religious rituals and history custom, and approved by government.

In 2007, Golden Urn was institutionalized in the State Religious Affairs Bureau Order No. 5.

Overview 

Following the Buddhist belief in the principle of rebirth, the Dalai Lama is believed by Buddhists to be able to choose the body into which he is reincarnated. That person, when found, will then become the next Dalai Lama. According to Buddhist scholars it is the responsibility of the High Lamas of the Gelugpa tradition and the Tibetan government to seek out and find the next Dalai Lama following the death of the incumbent. The process can take a long time. It took four years to find the 14th (current) Dalai Lama, Tenzin Gyatso. The search is generally limited to Tibet, although the current Dalai Lama has said that there is a chance that he will not be reborn, and that if he is, it would not be in a country under Chinese rule. To help them in their search, the High Lamas may have visions or dreams, and try to find signs. For example, if the previous Dalai Lama was cremated, they can watch the direction of the smoke to suggest where the rebirth will take place.

When these signs have been interpreted and a successor found, there is a series of tests believed to ensure that they are the genuine reincarnation of the previous Dalai Lama. They assess the candidate against a set of criteria, and will present the child with various objects to see if they can identify those which belonged to the previous Dalai Lama. If a single candidate has been identified, the High Lamas will report their findings to eminent individuals and then to the Government. If more than one candidate is identified, the true successor is found by officials and monks drawing lots in a public ceremony. Once identified, the successful candidate and his family are taken to Lhasa (or Dharamsala) where the child will study the Buddhist scriptures in order to prepare for spiritual leadership.

According to Tibetan Buddhism the Tulkus do not have to take rebirth in a continuous sequence of lives in this world.

The first article of 29-Article Ordinance for the More Effective Governing of Tibet states that the purpose of Golden Urn is to ensure prosperity of Gelug, and to eliminate cheating and corruption in the selection process. The Qianlong Emperor  published The Discourse of Lama in 1792 to explain the history of lamas and the reincarnation system, while also explaining why he thought it would be a fair system of choosing them,  as opposed to choosing reincarnated lamas based on private designation, or based on one person's decision. The edict was also claimed to reduce the influence of corrupt families acquiring influence by holding multiple religious positions.

The Golden Urn became institutionalized in the State Religious Affairs Bureau Order No. 5 of the Central Government. Article 7 states that no group or individual may carry out activities related to searching for and identifying the reincarnated soul boy of the Living Buddha without authorization. Article 8 states that lot-drawing ceremony with Golden Urn is applicable to those rinpoches, or lamas who were reincarnated previously in history. 
Request of exemption is handled by State Administration for Religious Affairs,  for those with great impact, request of exemption is handled by State Council.

According to the 14th Dalai Lama 

In a 2004 interview with Time, the current Dalai Lama stated:

The Dalai Lama stated in 2007 that the next Dalai Lama could possibly be a woman, remarking, "If a woman reveals herself as more useful the lama could very well be reincarnated in this form".

On 24 September 2011, the Dalai Lama issued a statement concerning his reincarnation giving exact signs on how the next one should be chosen, the place of rebirth and that the Chinese appointed Dalai Lama should not be trusted.

In October 2019, the 14th Dalai Lama stated that because of the feudal origin of the Dalai Lama reincarnation system, the reincarnation system should end.

According to the Chinese government 
After the Dalai Lama title was created by Shunyi Wang in the Ming Dynasty, in 1578, based on the request of family of Shunyi Wang, in October 1587, seal of authority was granted to the Dalai Lama in 1587 by the emperor of China.

In 1793, the 29-Article Ordinance for the More Effective Governing of Tibet  was published, Article 1 states that the purpose of Golden Urn is to ensure prosperity of Gelug, and to eliminate cheating and corruption in the selection process. Article 12 states that relatives of the Dalai Lama or Panchen Lama must not hold government positions, or participate in political affairs.

In 1936, based on articles 2 and 7 of the Ordinance of Lama Temple Management, the Method of Reincarnation of Lamas was published by the Central Government. Article 3 states that Golden Urn ceremony should be held for reincarnated candidates. Article 7 states that soul boys should not be searched for from the current lama families.

On August 3, 2007, State Religious Affairs Bureau Order No. 5 was issued by China which states that all the reincarnations of tulkus of Tibetan Buddhism must get government approval, otherwise they are "illegal or invalid". Rule 8 says approval for request is required if lot-drawing process using Golden Urn is exempted.

In 2015, the Chairman Padma Choling (白玛赤林) of the Standing Committee of the People's Congress of Tibet said:

In October 2019, Chinese Foreign Ministry spokesman Geng Shuang stated

Opinion 
Some analysts opine that even if China uses Golden Urn to pick a future Dalai Lama, it will lack the legitimacy and popular support needed to be functional, as Tibetan Buddhists all over the world would not recognize it. According to Tibetan scholar Robert Barnett "This is one of the chief indicators that China has failed in Tibet. It's failed to find consistent leadership in Tibet by any Tibetan lama who is really respected by Tibetan people, and who at the same time endorses Communist Party rule." Lobsang Sangay, Sikyong (prime minister) of the Tibetan government-in-exile disparaged rules from the Qing Dynasty, said: "It's like Fidel Castro saying, 'I will select the next Pope and all the Catholics should follow'".

See also 

 Central Tibetan Administration
 History of Tibet
 Tibet Autonomous Region
 Tibetan Buddhism
 Tibet Policy and Support Act

References 

Dalai Lamas